"Trouble at Totleigh Towers" is the fifth episode of the fourth series of the 1990s British comedy television series Jeeves and Wooster. It is also called "Totleigh Towers". Some of the external scenes were filmed at Highclere Castle.

In the US, it was one of five episodes of Jeeves and Wooster that were not aired as part of the original broadcast of the television series on Masterpiece Theatre, though all episodes were made available on US home video releases. "The Bassetts' Fancy Dress Ball" aired as the fifth episode of the fourth series of Jeeves and Wooster instead.

In the episode, Wooster appears in blackface and uses racial stereotypes to impersonate a visiting dignitary.

Background 
Adapted from Stiff Upper Lip, Jeeves. The filming location for Totleigh Towers, where much of the episode takes place, was Highclere Castle.

Cast
 Bertie Wooster – Hugh Laurie
 Jeeves – Stephen Fry
 Roderick Spode – John Turner
 Sir Watkyn – John Woodnutt
 Madeline Bassett – Elizabeth Morton
 Stiffy Byng – Charlotte Attenborough
 Gussie Fink-Nottle – Richard Braine
 Stinker Pinker – Simon Treves
 Major Plank – Norman Rodway
 Constable Oates – Sidney Livingstone
 Emerald Stoker – Emma Hewitt
 Toto – Colin McFarlane
 Butterfield – Preston Lockwood

Plot
Stiffy tasks Bertie with stealing a statuette that is believed to be cursed. Gussie Fink-Nottle resists his fiancée Madeline Bassett's attempts to make him a vegetarian.

See also
 List of Jeeves and Wooster characters

References

External links

Jeeves and Wooster episodes
1993 British television episodes